WISC may refer to:

 Wechsler Intelligence Scale for Children
 WISC-TV, a television station (channel 11, virtual 3) licensed to Madison, Wisconsin, United States
Wisconsin, short form of Wisconsin
 Wisconsin Integrally Synchronized Computer
 Writable instruction set computer
 University of Wisconsin–Madison
 West Indian Students' Centre, London